Brad S. Karp is an American lawyer. He currently serves as chair of Paul, Weiss, Rifkind, Wharton & Garrison LLP. He is also a prolific bundler for Democratic Party presidential candidates in the United States, having raised substantial sums for the presidential campaigns of Kamala Harris, Cory Booker, Joe Biden, Amy Klobuchar, and others.

Biography 
Karp earned his B.A. from Union College in 1981. He went on to receive a J.D. from Harvard Law School in 1984. Aside from a clerkship under Judge Irving R. Kaufman in the United States Court of Appeals for the Second Circuit, Karp has worked continuously at Paul, Weiss since his days as a summer associate.

Career 
Karp has represented a wide range of clients in his career, including many financial services firms. His client list includes JPMorgan Chase, Wachovia, Morgan Stanley, Apollo Global Management, Merrill Lynch, Deloitte, MacAndrews & Forbes, ING, Bear Stearns, Ericsson, Hexion, Scottish Power and Eton Park in securities, commercial and regulatory matters.

The strength of his work for Citigroup in the wake of the Enron and WorldCom scandals featured prominently in Paul, Weiss being named "Litigation Department of the Year" by The American Lawyer in 2006.

Karp was named chair of Paul, Weiss in 2008 at the age of 48 and continues to practice law. Prior to his election, he co-chaired the firm's litigation department.

Brad serves as a director of the Legal Action Center, a non-profit law and policy organization in the U.S. whose sole mission is to fight discrimination against people with histories of addiction, HIV/AIDS, or criminal records.

Awards and Recognitions 
Brad has won numerous awards for his legal accomplishments, including receiving the New York Law Journal's first Impact Award in 2013, for “innovations to the partnership model … outstanding representation of clients during the financial crisis …  and commitment to public service that has boosted the firms' pro bono hours.” In 2012, he was named by The Financial Times as one of 10 lawyers who are “agents for change.” Best Lawyer selected him as "Banking and Finance Litigator of the Year" for 2017 and 2014.

References

External links 
 Paul, Weiss homepage
 Paul, Weiss Bio of Brad S. Karp

American lawyers
1960 births
Living people
Harvard Law School alumni
Union College (New York) alumni
Paul, Weiss, Rifkind, Wharton & Garrison people